Richard Somerset Le Poer Trench, 4th Earl of Clancarty, 3rd Marquess of Heusden (13 January 1834 – 29 May 1891), styled Viscount Dunlo between 1837 and 1872, was an Irish peer, as well a nobleman in the Dutch nobility.

Biography
He was born in Dublin, Ireland, the son of William Trench, 3rd Earl of Clancarty, and Lady Sarah Juliana Butler. On 29 November 1866, he married Lady Adeliza Georgiana Hervey, daughter of Frederick William Hervey, 2nd Marquess of Bristol, and Lady Katherine Isabella Manners.

They had three children:
William Frederick Le Poer Trench, 5th Earl of Clancarty (29 December 1868 – 16 February 1929)
Lady Katherine Anne Le Poer Trench (12 August 1871 – 25 February 1953)
The Hon. Richard John Le Poer Trench (25 December 1877 – 10 August 1960).

He is buried with his wife Adeliza on the western side of Highgate Cemetery.

References 
thepeerage.com Accessed April 11, 2009

External links
 

1834 births
1891 deaths
Burials at Highgate Cemetery
Richard
Earls of Clancarty